The 2021–22 Dayton Flyers men's basketball team represented the University of Dayton in the 2021–22 NCAA Division I men's basketball season. Their head coach was Anthony Grant, in his fifth season with the Flyers. The Flyers played their home games at UD Arena in Dayton, Ohio as members of the Atlantic 10 Conference. They finished the season 24-11, 14-4 in A-10 Play to finish a tie for 2nd place. They defeated UMass in the quarterfinals of the Atlantic 10 tournament before losing in the semifinals to Richmond. They were one of the last four teams not selected for the NCAA tournament and received an at-large bid to the National Invitation Tournament where they defeated Toledo in the first round before losing in the second round to Vanderbilt.

Previous season
In a season limited due to the ongoing COVID-19 pandemic, the Flyers finished the 2020–21 season 14–10, 9–7 in A-10 play to finish in seventh place. In the Atlantic 10 tournament as a 7th seed, they defeated Rhode Island in the second round before losing to VCU in the quarterfinals.

Offseason

Departures

Incoming transfers

2021 recruiting class

Roster

Schedule and results

|-
!colspan=12 style=| Exhibition

|-
!colspan=12 style=| Non-conference regular season

|-
!colspan=12 style=| Atlantic 10 Regular Season

|-
!colspan=12 style=| A-10 tournament

|-
!colspan=12 style=| NIT tournament

Source:

References

Dayton Flyers men's basketball seasons
Dayton
Dayton
2021 in sports in Ohio
2022 in sports in Ohio